Prague-West District is a district in the Central Bohemian Region of the Czech Republic. Its capital is Prague. The most populated town of the district is Jesenice.

Administrative division
Prague-West District is formed by only one administrative district of municipality with extended competence: Černošice.

List of municipalities
Towns are marked in bold and market towns in italics:

Bojanovice –
Bratřínov –
Březová-Oleško –
Buš –
Černolice –
Černošice –
Červený Újezd –
Choteč –
Chrášťany –
Chýně –
Chýnice –
Číčovice –
Čisovice –
Davle –
Dobrovíz –
Dobříč –
Dobřichovice –
Dolní Břežany –
Drahelčice –
Holubice –
Horoměřice –
Hostivice –
Hradištko –
Hvozdnice –
Jeneč –
Jesenice –
Jílové u Prahy –
Jíloviště –
Jinočany –
Kamenný Přívoz –
Karlík –
Klínec –
Kněževes –
Kosoř –
Kytín –
Lety –
Libčice nad Vltavou –
Libeř –
Lichoceves –
Líšnice –
Měchenice –
Mníšek pod Brdy –
Nučice –
Ohrobec –
Okoř –
Okrouhlo –
Ořech –
Petrov –
Pohoří –
Průhonice –
Psáry –
Ptice –
Řevnice –
Řitka –
Roblín –
Roztoky –
Rudná –
Slapy –
Statenice –
Štěchovice –
Středokluky –
Svrkyně –
Tachlovice –
Trnová –
Třebotov –
Tuchoměřice –
Tursko –
Úholičky –
Úhonice –
Únětice –
Velké Přílepy –
Vestec –
Vonoklasy –
Vrané nad Vltavou –
Všenory –
Zahořany –
Zbuzany –
Zlatníky-Hodkovice –
Zvole

Geography

The territory of the district forms a half-moon surrounding Prague from the west. The elongated shape of the territory thus extends into different types of landscapes, in the north rather flat, in the south more rugged and hilly. It extends into five geomorphological mesoregions: Prague Plateau (north and east), Křivoklát Highlands (small part in the west), Hořovice Uplands (elongated part around the Berounka River), Brdy Highlands (elongated part south of the Berounka) and Benešov Uplands (south).

The most important rivers are the Vltava and Berounka, both flowing through the southern part of the district and heading to their confluence on the territory of Prague. The Vltava also briefly forms the district border in the north, after it leaves Prague. In the eastern part of the district, the Sázava flows into the Vltava. The territory is rather poor in bodies of water, but there are three large reservoirs on the Vltava: Slapy (partly), Štěchovice and Vrané.

Bohemian Karst is the only protected landscape area that extends into the district, in its central part.

Demographics
Thanks to its proximity to Prague, Prague-West District belongs to the fastest growing districts in the country in the 21st century.

Most populated municipalities

Economy
The largest employers with its headquarters in Beroun District and at least 500 employers are:

Transport
The territory of the district is crossed by several motorways leading from Prague: the D4 motorway to Písek, the D5 motorway to Plzeň, the D6 motorway to Karlovy Vary, and the D7 motorway to Chomutov. Part of the D0 motorway (Czech Republic) also passes through the district.

Sights

The Průhonice Castle Park was designated a UNESCO World Heritage Site in 2010 (as part of Historic Centre of Prague). It is described as "original masterpiece of garden landscape architecture of worldwide importance".

The most important monuments in the district, protected as national cultural monuments, are:
Levý Hradec gord
Gord and Celtic oppidum Závist in Dolní Břežany
Průhonice Castle

The best-preserved settlements and archaeological sites, protected as monument reservations and monument zones, are:
Dobrovíz (monument reservation)
Levý Hradec gord area (monument reservation)
Jílové u Prahy (monument zone)
Mníšek pod Brdy (monument zone)

The most visited tourist destination is the Průhonice castle & arboretum.

References

External links

Prague-West District profile on the Czech Statistical Office's website

 
Districts of the Czech Republic